Hiyy Vindhaa Nulaa is a 2011 Maldivian romantic drama film produced and directed by Mohamed Aboobakuru. Produced by Enboo Maa Studio, the film stars Shafiu Mohamed, Mariyam Naajee, Muslima Abdulla and Mariyam Afeefa in pivotal roles. The film was released on 2 February 2011.

Synopsis
Maisha (Mariyam Naajee), the mother of two children is diagnosed with a blood trauma which devastates her caring husband, Shafiu Mohamed (Visham). Counting her last days, Maisha requests Visham to marry another woman and to settle with his life before she dies. Hesitated, Visham marries his ex-girlfriend, Suzy (Muslima Abdulla)

Cast 
 Shafiu Mohamed as Visham
 Mariyam Naajee as Maisha
 Muslima Abdulla as Suzy
 Aishath Rafa Rashadh
 Ahmed Zaul Rasheed
 Mariyam Afeefa
 Fathimath Jeeza
 Fauziyya Hassan as Suzy's mother
 Ibrahim Manik
 Ahmed Riffath
 Ahmed Waheed
 Ibrahim Naseem

Soundtrack

References

2011 films
2011 romantic drama films
Maldivian romantic drama films
Dhivehi-language films